Svend Samuelson (January 24, 1825January 15, 1891) was a Norwegian American immigrant, farmer, and Republican politician.  He was a member of the Wisconsin State Assembly, representing Manitowoc County in the 1871 session.

Biography

Samuelson was born in Christiana, Norway, in January 1825.  He received a common school education and emigrated to the United States, settling in the town of Liberty, in Manitowoc County, Wisconsin, in 1854.  He established a farm there, and served for more than ten years as town clerk.

At the outbreak of the American Civil War, he volunteered for service in the Union Army with the 15th Wisconsin Infantry Regiment, frequently referred to as the "Scandinavian Regiment" due to being mostly composed of recent Scandinavian American immigrants.  Samuelson was commissioned second lieutenant of Company F in the regiment while it was being organized at Camp Randall, in Madison.  The 15th Wisconsin Infantry operated in the western theater of the war, and saw significant combat in Kentucky and Tennessee.  Samuelson served for nearly two years, but resigned in the fall of 1863 due to poor health.

Samuelson returned to Manitowoc County after the war.  He was elected to the Wisconsin State Assembly in the 1870 election, running on the Republican Party ticket.  He represented Manitowoc County's 1st Assembly district in the 1871 legislative session.  At that time, his district comprised roughly the southern half of the county.  He did not run for re-election in 1871.

He moved from Manitowoc to Sturgeon Bay, Wisconsin, around 1875.  He died at his home in Sturgeon Bay on the morning of January 15, 1891, after suffering many years from an incurable lung disease, stemming from his years in the war.

Electoral history

Wisconsin Assembly (1870)

| colspan="6" style="text-align:center;background-color: #e9e9e9;"| General Election, November 8, 1870

References

1825 births
1891 deaths
Norwegian emigrants to the United States
People from Manitowoc County, Wisconsin
People from Sturgeon Bay, Wisconsin
Republican Party members of the Wisconsin State Assembly
Farmers from Wisconsin
People of Wisconsin in the American Civil War
Union Army officers
19th-century American politicians